Magnotta is an Italian surname. Notable people with the surname include:

Luka Magnotta (born 1982), Canadian pornographic actor and convicted murderer
Mario Magnotta (1942–2009), Italian janitor and internet celebrity

Italian-language surnames